"Be Kind" is a song by American producer Marshmello and American singer Halsey. It was released as a single through Joytime Collective, Astralwerks, and Capitol Records on May 1, 2020. "Be Kind" peaked at number 29 on the Billboard Hot 100. Outside of the United States, "Be Kind" peaked at number one in Flanders (Belgium), within the top 20 of the charts in Australia, Canada, Lithuania, Malaysia, Singapore, and Wallonia (Belgium), as well as the top 40 of the charts in the Czech Republic, Estonia, Hungary, the Netherlands, New Zealand, Norway, the Republic of Ireland, and the United Kingdom. The song appears on Halsey's eighth extended play (EP) and first compilation EP, Collabs (2020), serving as its lead single, and also appears on the expanded version of her third studio album, Manic (2020), serving as its fourth single.

Background and promotion
Marshmello and Halsey indirectly came out announcing a collaboration on April 29, 2020, through their social media by posting a flower visual each and the caption "friday". The two musicians went on to reveal the song title and cover art, a painting of a flower with a pink sticker, a day later through their social media.

Composition
Musically, "Be Kind" is an "emotional" EDM song that sees Marshmello and Halsey "[exploring] trust issues and [reinforcing] that it's OK to be vulnerable with someone you love." In terms of music notation, "Be Kind" was composed using  common time in the key of E major, with a tempo of 94 beats per minute. Halsey's vocal range spans from the low note F3 to the high note of C5.

Music video
A music video was released on YouTube on June 28, 2020. It was directed by Hannah Lux Davis. The video begins with Halsey sitting in a chair and dancing around a large grey room. Later she appears dancing in a seemingly digital utopia full of flowers and sakura trees. At the end of the video, she awakens back in the grey room where she attempts to communicate with Marshmello, who is seen on a small screen directly in front of her. As of September 17, 2021, the video has over 82 million views.

Remixes
A remix of the song by fellow DJ Surf Mesa was released on June 17, 2020. Another remix of the song by DJ Jacques Lu Cont was released on June 26, 2020. A third remix of the song by the DJ trio Joy Club was released on July 10, 2020. A fourth remix of the song by upcoming DJ BLVD was released on the same day as the Joy Club remix for free download.

Personnel
Credits adapted from Tidal.

 Marshmello – songwriting, composition, production, programming
 Ashley Frangipane – vocals, songwriting, composition
 Gian Stone – songwriting, composition, production, additional producer, programming
 Amy Allen – songwriting, composition
 Freddy Wexler – songwriting, composition
 Aria McKnight – A&R
 Jeremy Vuernick – A&R
 Elizabeth Isik – A&R administration
 Brandon Buttner – engineering, vocal production, studio personnel
 Michelle Mansini – master engineering, studio personnel
 John Hanes – mixing engineering, studio personnel
 Serban Ghenea – mixing, studio personnel

Charts

Weekly charts

Year-end charts

Certifications

Release history

References

2020 singles
2020 songs
Marshmello songs
Halsey (singer) songs
Music videos directed by Hannah Lux Davis
Songs written by Halsey (singer)
Songs written by Amy Allen (songwriter)
Songs written by Marshmello
Songs written by Freddy Wexler
Capitol Records singles
Astralwerks singles